Proton R3 is the motorsport and performance division of the Malaysian automotive brand Proton. The name R3 is an abbreviation of "Race. Rally. Research". By the end of May 2017, Proton announced that funds will be channeled to the company's core operations instead.

History

Proton R3 was established in 2003 as a division of Proton. It was originally formed as a successor to Proton's motorsport division, Proton PERT which was active between 1987 and 2002. The former division was a collaboration between Petronas, Mitsubishi Motors' Ralliart and Edaran Otomobil Nasional (EON), to form Petronas EON Racing Team, or Proton PERT.

Proton PERT

Proton PERT was formed in 1987, as a way for Proton to gain exposure in the motorsport scene, especially that in rally racing. During this period, Proton worked closely with Mitsubishi's Ralliart to help specialise in their cars to take part in various races between 1991 and 2002. During its early years, Proton PERT was fairly successful, managing to gain success in the Group S rally with their Proton Iswara 4WD Turbo Group S between 1991 and 1994, and scoring a win during the 2002 Production World Rally Championship (PWRC).

Proton R3

After the formation of Proton R3 in Shah Alam, Selangor, it replaced Proton PERT in Proton's motorsport scene. Proton's new motorsport division continued to take part in championships with team partner, British based Mellors Elliot Motorsport (MEM), such as during the 2009 FIA's Asia-Pacific Rally Championship (APRC), and the Intercontinental Rally Challenge (IRC) with the Proton Satria Neo S2000, up till 2011. During the 2009 IRC, Proton R3 finished in 2nd place during the 2009 Rally Scotland, with drivers Guy Wilks, Bryan Bouffier and Alister McRae, scoring 13 points.

During the 2010 Intercontinental Rally Challenge season, Proton R3 had many retirements and did not score a single point. The drivers were Alister McRae, Chris Atkinson, Niall McShea, Keith Cronin, Gilles Panizzi and a privateer with factory support, Tom Cave. The best result from the 2010 season was Gilles Panizzi securing 22nd place at the 2010 Rallye Sanremo, although it was the only finish for the Proton Satria Neo S2000 in that season.

In 2011, during the opening round of the 2011 IRC season, at the famous Rallye Monte Carlo, Proton entered two cars. Chris Atkinson retired during the first special stage and Per-Gunnar Andersson during the second special stage. Later that same year, Proton R3 managed to score a win at the China Rally, where it clinched the Asia-Pacific Rally Championship driver's and manufacturer's titles and capped off a dominant season for Proton R3.

Alister McRae continued to drive the Proton Satria Neo S2000 to its fourth victory of the season in six rounds when he completed the three-day China Rally, ahead of Finnish driver Jari Ketomaa in the Mitsubishi Lancer Evolution X, with teammate Chris Atkinson finishing third to make it an all Proton 1–2 in the APRC driver's championship. The Satria Neo S2000's dominant performance all year long also declared Proton the winner of the coveted APRC manufacturer's championship ahead of Mitsubishi and Subaru.

The results in China also saw Proton becoming the first car manufacturer to win all eight major individual titles in the FIA APRC which includes the overall FIA APRC driver's title, FIA APRC manufacturer's title, the FIA APRC Teams Trophy, the FIA Asia Cup driver's title, the FIA Pacific Cup driver's title, the manufacturer's title in the FIA APRC Rally Cup for two-wheel drive category, the FIA APRC Rally Cup two-wheel drive driver's title, and the FIA APRC Junior Cup driver's title.

Models

Proton R3 is also responsible with the tuning and upgrade of certain Proton models, such as the Proton Satria, Proton Saga and the Proton Iriz.

Proton Satria R3

First generation

The Proton Satria R3 was a limited edition, track-focused version of Proton's Satria hatchback, with only 150 units produced. It was a redefined version of the Satria GTi in collaboration with Lotus. The body shell has been improved with double stitch welded monocoque chassis with front and rear strut tower brace bars. Body weight has been lightened as well.

Second generation

The Satria Neo R3 was unveiled in 2008, featuring a naturally aspired 1.6-litre engine producing 100 kW (136 PS; 134 hp) or 110 bhp (82 kW; 112 PS), which Proton says will deliver a "controlled yet exciting driving experience". Other upgrades include a sportier bodykit, 17-inch wheels, a lowered suspension setup derived from Lotus, an improved braking system, Recaro lightweight seats and a MOMO steering wheel.

Proton Saga R3 and Proton Iriz R3

The Proton Saga R3 and Proton Iriz R3, launched in 2021, are limited editions of the original third generation Proton Saga and Proton Iriz models respectively. The special editions come in black paint scheme with yellow highlights, upgraded interior, a modified bodykit and feature the Proton R3 badging predominantly. Most of the changes are purely cosmetic to celebrate Proton’s success in the motorsports division.

IRC Results

**Including 10 points that Wilks scored with Škoda Fabia S2000 at Rally Scotland.
**Including 2 points that Basso scored with Peugeot 207 S2000 at Rallye Monte Carlo.

SWRC results

* Season still in progress.

APRC results

References

External links

Malaysian auto racing teams
Intercontinental Rally Challenge teams
World Rally Championship teams
Official motorsports and performance division of automakers
Malaysian brands
DRB-HICOM
Companies based in Shah Alam
Government-owned companies of Malaysia
Proton vehicles
European Rally Championship teams
British Touring Car Championship teams